Neutoggenburg District is a former district of the canton of St. Gallen in Switzerland.
It was detached from Obertoggenburg District in 1831, and merged into the single district of Toggenburg in 2002.

Former districts of the canton of St. Gallen